The term heat rate may refer to:

 Heat capacity rate
 Heat transfer, measured by "Heat transfer rate"
 Rate of heat flow, or "Heat flow rate"
 Heat rate (efficiency), a performance parameter for power stations

Rates